Aviator Nunatak is the northernmost of three large nunataks in the upper Liv Glacier, standing  east of Mount Wells, Antarctica. It was named by the Southern Party of the New Zealand Geological Survey Antarctic Expedition (1961–62) for the aviators of Rear Admiral Richard Evelyn Byrd's flight to the South Pole in 1929.

References
 

Nunataks of Antarctica
Amundsen Coast